"Sample in a Jar" is a song by the American band Phish. 

On the surface, the lyrics seem to deal with a relationship argument while intoxicated. In The Phish Book, Trey mentioned that the song is “basically about sitting in a car with the seatbelt on, drunk.”

The song is covered by the band Little Feat on the album Chinese Work Songs.

Personnel
Musicians
Trey Anastasio – guitars, vocals
Page McConnell – keyboards, vocals
Mike Gordon – bass guitar, vocals
Jon Fishman – drums, vocals

Also appears on
Stash (1996)
Live Phish Volume 2 (2001)
Live Phish Volume 3 (2002)
Live Phish Volume 10 (2002)
Live Phish Volume 18 (2003)
Live In Brooklyn (CD/DVD) (2006)
The Clifford Ball (DVD) (2009)
Chicago '94 (2012)
Star Lake 98 (DVD) (2012)

Notes

Phish songs
Elektra Records singles
Songs written by Trey Anastasio
1995 singles
1994 songs
Songs written by Tom Marshall (singer)